Medician may refer to:

Medical professionals
 biomedical doctor (medical scientist)
 physician
 nurse

Other
 of or pertaining to the Medici family